Nysa or Nyssa (flourished second half of 2nd century BC) was a Princess from the Kingdom of Cappadocia in Anatolia.

Nysa was a royal of Greek Macedonian and Persian ancestry. She was the daughter and first-born child of the monarchs Ariarathes VI of Cappadocia and Laodice of Cappadocia. Her parents were cousins and her younger brothers were the Kings Ariarathes VII of Cappadocia and Ariarathes VIII of Cappadocia. She was the namesake of her paternal grandmother Nysa of Cappadocia a previous Queen, wife of the previous King Ariarathes V of Cappadocia and mother of Ariarathes VI. She was born and raised in Cappadocia.

At an unknown date, Nysa became the first wife Greek King Nicomedes III of Bithynia, who reigned between from c. 127 BC to c. 94 BC. Nysa and Nicomedes III were distantly related as they held lineage from the Seleucid dynasty, the Antipatrid dynasty and the Antigonid dynasty. Through marriage, she became Queen of Bithynia.

Nysa bore Nicomedes III a daughter also named Nysa Not much is known about her life after her daughters birth. Nicomedes III married her mother after some time, possibly because Nysa died.

Quotes

References
 Primary sources
Justin, Epitome of the Philippic History of Pompeius Trogus (Classical Resources Series, No 3), Society for Classical Studies Classical Resources, Oxford University Press, U.S.A., 1994; 

 Secondary sources
 http://www.ancienthistory.com/smith-bio/3180.html
 Cartledge, P. Garnsey P. Gruen, E.S., Hellenistic constructs: essays in culture, history and historiography (Hellenistic Culture and Society), University of California Press, 1997; 
 Gabelko, O. L., The Dynastic History of the Hellenistic Monarchies of Asia Minor According to Chronography of George Synkellos. 
 McGing, . C., The foreign policy of Mithridates VI Eupator, King of Pontus, BRILL, 1986; 

Hellenistic Cappadocia
Ancient Greek princesses
2nd-century BC women
2nd-century BC Asian people
Queens of Bithynia
Ariarathid dynasty